The 2013–14 Norfolk State Spartans men's basketball team represented Norfolk State University during the 2013–14 NCAA Division I men's basketball season. The Spartans, led by first year coach Robert Jones, played their home games at the Joseph G. Echols Memorial Hall and were members of the Mid-Eastern Athletic Conference. They finished the season 19–15, 11–5 in MEAC play to finish in a tie for third place. They advanced to the semifinals of the MEAC tournament where they lost to North Carolina Central. They were invited to the CollegeInsider.com Tournament where they lost in the first round to Eastern Michigan.

Roster

Schedule

|-
!colspan=9 style="background:#007A5E; color:#E6B012;"| Regular season

|-
!colspan=9 style="background:#007A5E; color:#E6B012;"| MEAC tournament

|-
!colspan=9 style="background:#007A5E; color:#E6B012;"| CIT

References

Norfolk State Spartans men's basketball seasons
Norfolk State
Norfolk State
Norfolk State Spartans men's basketball
Norfolk State Spartans men's basketball